Małe (Polish:"little") may refer to:

Małe, Łódź Voivodeship, Poland
Małe, Pomeranian Voivodeship, Poland

See also
 
 Male (disambiguation)